"Royalty" is a song by American rapper and singer XXXTentacion featuring British rapper Stefflon Don and Jamaican musicians Ky-Mani Marley and Vybz Kartel. Written alongside producer JonFX, it was released on July 19, 2019 as the lead single from the former's fourth and final studio album, Bad Vibes Forever.

Background 
About five months before XXXTentacion's death, X had posted on his Instagram story that he would be collaborating on a song with Vybz Kartel. After X's death, his mother, Cleopatra Bernard announced on Instagram that the song "Royalty" would be released on July 19, 2019, with additional features from Ki-Mani Marley and Stefflon Don. It was originally reported by the Los Angeles Times that the single would be on the upcoming deluxe version of X's sophomore album, ?, but it was instead released on his fourth studio album, Bad Vibes Forever.

Personnel
 XXXTentacion – songwriting, composition
 Ky-Mani Marley – songwriting, composition
 Stefflon Don - songwriting, composition
 Vybz Kartel - songwriting, composition
 JonFX – songwriting, composition, production
 Koen Heldens – mixing
 Kevin Peterson – mastering 
 Dave Kutch – mastering

References

External links
 

2019 singles
2019 songs
Empire Distribution singles
Stefflon Don songs
XXXTentacion songs
Songs released posthumously
Songs written by Stefflon Don
Songs written by XXXTentacion